San Buenaventura is one of the 38 municipalities of Coahuila, in north-eastern Mexico. The municipal seat lies at San Buenaventura. The municipality covers an area of 3527.8 km².

As of 2005, the municipality had a total population of 19,620.

Localities 

 Santa Gertrudis

References

Municipalities of Coahuila